X (as in the Roman numeral for 10) is the tenth studio album by Finnish gothic rock band The 69 Eyes. The band chose "Red" as their first single. Days before the release of X, they released "Borderline" as their second single.

"Rosary Blue", a bonus track, features vocals by American tattoo artist Kat Von D.

Reception 

The Blistering magazine marked a "versatile" mix of styles with notes of Billy Idol, Johnny Cash and Danzig. The reviewer wrote also that the marketing of the album and the band in general would benefit from their change to the Nuclear Blast label.

X received mixed reviews from the German music press. In a very positive review, the Orkus magazine noted a change from guitar-dominated hymns to melodic rock tunes and praised singer Jyrki69's
"passionate" singing. Metal Hammer Germany released two different staff reviews, noting that the board of editors was at odds with rating the album. While Enrico Ahlig praised a return to melodic ballads and a "Finnish melancholy", and rated "Borderline" the best track by The 69 Eyes for the last ten years, Jakob Kranz wrote a negative review. He called the songs "sticky" and noted that the album sounded too commercial.

Track listing

Singles

Notes 
The singles "Love Runs Away" and "Tonight" were released simultaneously via iTunes. "Tonight" was released exclusively in Finland, whereas "Love Runs Away" was released everywhere else.

Credits 
Jyrki 69 – vocals
Bazie – lead guitar
Timo-Timo – rhythm guitar
Archzie – bass
Jussi 69 – drums
Kat Von D – female vocals on "Rosary Blue"

References 

2012 albums
The 69 Eyes albums